Nicholas Ridgely (September 30, 1762 – April 1, 1830) was a Delaware lawyer, politiican, and judge who served as Attorney General of Delaware and as the second Chancellor of Delaware.

Early life, education, and career
Born in Dover, Delaware, Ridgely belonged to a family of public and social prominence which "for many successive generations in Delaware has furnished judges and lawyers of marked ability". He was the eldest son of John Charles Greensburg Ridgely and Mary Wynkoop Ridgeley, the father being an accomplished physician of Kent County, Delaware, who was himself the son of the earlier Judge Nicholas Ridgely and a descendent of Colonel Henry Ridgley.

Ridgeley read law under Judge Robert Goldsborough at Cambridge, Maryland, and was admitted to the Delaware bar at Newcastle in 1787. He quickly "attained a conspicuous standing at the bar even among such distinguished members as the elder James A. Bayard, Caesar Augustus Rodney, and Nicholas Van Dyke Jr." and "was repeatedly elected a member of the general assembly, and drafted the principal legislation required by the changes wrought" by the American Revolution and the recently adopted Constitution of the United States. In 1791, Ridgeley was appointed attorney general of Delaware and held that office for 10 years. He was leading member of the state constitutional convention of 1791–92,

Chancellor of Delaware
In December 1801, Chancellor William Killen resigned his office, and Ridgely was appointed to succeed him on  December 6, 1801. This development marked a substantial evolution of the office:

In 1802, the orphans court jurisdiction was transferred from the court of common pleas to the chancellor by an amendment to the constitution of 1792, effected mainly by Ridgely's influence. He thereby became sole judge of the orphans court.

Personal life and death
Although he lived until the 1830s he still adhered to the manners and garb of the olden times. Towards the close of his life, he suffered from ill health, although he sturdily discharged his judicial duties to the end. He died of heart disease at the age of 67, within a half hour after he had adjourned his court at Georgetown, and was buried in the Episcopal churchyard at Dover. In 1932, a commemorative plaque was installed at his burial site.

References

Justices of the Delaware Supreme Court
1762 births
1830 deaths
People from Dover, Delaware
American lawyers admitted to the practice of law by reading law
Members of the Delaware General Assembly
Delaware Attorneys General
Chancellors of Delaware